Introspection is the debut solo album by classical and progressive rock musician Thijs van Leer, released in 1972.

Track listing
Side one
 "Pavanne" (Op. 50) (Gabriel Fauré) 5:46
 "Rondo" (Rogier van Otterloo) 3:02
 "Agnus Dei" (from Mass in B minor) (Johann Sebastian Bach) 4:57
 "Focus I" (Thijs van Leer) 4:05

Side two
 "Erbarme Dich" (from St. Matthew Passion) (Bach) 7:22
 "Focus II" (Van Leer) 4:18
 "Introspection" (Van Otterloo) 5:25

Personnel
 Letty DeJong – vocals
 Thijs Van Leer – flute
 Rogier Van Otterloo - arrangements, conductor

Thijs van Leer albums
1972 albums